Saluni may refer to the following places in India:
 Saluni, Himachal Pradesh, a town in Himachal Pradesh
 Saluni, Saharanpur, a village in Uttar Pradesh